Four ships of the Royal Navy have borne the name HMS Southsea Castle, named after Southsea Castle on Portsea Island, Hampshire, England:
, a 32-gun fifth-rate frigate launched in 1696 at Redbridge. On 15 September 1697 she was wrecked on the coast of England near Hoylake.
, a 32-gun fifth-rate frigate launched in 1697 at Deptford Dockyard.

 built at Portsmouth by John Naish

See also 
 PS Southsea Castle (1930)

Royal Navy ship names